Aneja Beganovič (born 9 November 1997) is a Slovenian female handballer for RK Krim and the Slovenian national team.

International honours
EHF Cup Winners' Cup:
Semifinalist: 2016

References

External links

1997 births
Living people
Handball players from Ljubljana
Slovenian female handball players
Expatriate handball players
Slovenian expatriate sportspeople in Croatia
Slovenian expatriate sportspeople in France
RK Podravka Koprivnica players